Casanovas is a Swedish dansband established in 1989 in Vadstena, Sweden. They won the Svenska dansbandsmästerskapen, the Swedish Dansband Competition in 1998 with Andreas Hedenskog as vocalist. The present line-up of the band is Henrik Sethsson on vocals (who has replaced Hedenskog), Jimmy Lindberg on guitar, Stefan Ryding on bass and Hans Plahn on drums.

Their album Livet börja nu released on 30 May 2012 entered the official Swedish Albums Chart at #6 in its initial week of release.

Discography

Albums

Songs
1998: "Kärleken lever"
1999: "Minns du mig än"
2000: "I varje del av mitt hjärta"
2000: "Vem får din kärlek idag"
2001: "Om natten"
2002: "I dina ögon"
2002: "Låt drömmarna leva"

References

External links
Official website

Dansbands
Musical groups established in 1989
1989 establishments in Sweden
Atenzia Records artists
Melodifestivalen contestants of 2023